Macrozafra is a genus of dove snails.

Species
 Macrozafra cophinodes (Suter, 1908) 
 Macrozafra enwrighti Powell, 1940 
 Macrozafra mariae Powell, 1940 
 Macrozafra nodicincta (Suter, 1899) 
 Macrozafra subabnormis(Suter, 1899)
 Macrozafra vivens (Powell, 1934)

References

External links
 Finlay, H. J. (1926). A further commentary on New Zealand molluscan systematics. Transactions of the New Zealand Institute. 57: 320-485, pls 18-23

Columbellidae
Gastropods described in 1926